Malcolm Cameron may refer to:

Malcolm Cameron (Australian politician) (1873–1935), Australian politician
Malcolm Cameron (Canadian politician) (1808–1867), Canadian businessman and political figure
Malcolm Cameron (entomologist) (1873–1954), English physician and entomologist
Malcolm Cameron (ice hockey) (born 1969), Canadian professional ice hockey coach
Malcolm Colin Cameron (1831–1898), businessman and member of the Canadian House of Commons
Malcolm Graeme Cameron (1857–1925), lawyer and member of the Ontario legislative assembly
Cam Cameron (Malcolm Cameron, born 1961), American football coach